1857 Kranti is an Indian historical drama television series directed by Sanjay Khan and produced by Numero Uno International Limited. The drama, aired on Doordarshan National from 2002 to 2003, tells the story of the Indian Revolt of 1857. The drama was temporarily interrupted after four episodes in its earlier run due to change in commissioning norms.

Cast 

 Lalit Tiwari as Bajirao II
Ashok Banthia as Moropant, advisor to Bajirao II
 Sunil Singh as Tatya Tope
 Bhupinder Singh as Nana Sahib
 Barkha Madan as Lakshmibai
 S. M. Zaheer as Bahadur Shah Zafar
 Jitendra Trehan as Gangadhar Rao Newalkar / Ghulam Abbas
Ajay Trehan as Kunwar Singh
 Maya Alagh as Zeenat Mahal
 Shashank Trivedi as Young Nana Sahib
 Siraj Mustafa Khan as Siraj ud-Daulah
 Nawab Shah as Robert Clive
Gireesh Sahdev as William Bentinck
 Anwar Fatehan as Mir Jafar
Anupam Shyam as Pandit Vadarayan
 Rishabh Shukla as Mirza Ghalib
 Saurabh Dubey as Trimbakrao Pandit, Raj Purohit in Jhansi Kingdom 
 Vinod Kapoor as William Stephen Raikes Hodson
 Ahmed Khan as Lord Dalhousie
 Hariom Parashar as Narayan Bhat aka Madhav Narayan
 Surbhi Tiwari as Vaishali, Nana Sahib's wife
 Manish Khanna as Azimullah Khan
 Syed Badr-ul Hasan Khan Bahadur as Manekchand

Cameo
 Raza Murad as Jahangir
 Tej Sapru as Thomas Roe

Background and production
Speaking at the launch of the drama, Sanjay Khan, Chairman and Managing Director of the Numero Uno said, "The revolt of 1857 referred to as the Second Mutiny by the British is a very important facet of India’s freedom struggle. Therefore, in the age of low-cost family dramas, I have attempted to bring serials which have qualities of an epic and good cinematic values. India's first war of independence of 1857 is not more than three pages in any school textbook. What we are presenting is the drama and the sacrifices that people made for the nation so that nationalistic fervour is never lessened, but enhanced." There are quite a few songs in the drama that don't stop the progression of the story. We have recorded three songs out of the 20 planned. "We are proud to say this is the most expensive serial on Indian television, a television series on a cinematic scale," claims Hormuzda Davar, the CEO of the Numero Uno. The crew included over 150 technicians, 80 artistes, 150 horses, 10 elephants, 50 camels and over 2000 sword fighters. The drama approximately cost Rs 16 crore.

The first 12 episodes of the drama was shot in Rajasthan, Chambal, Trichur, Red Fort, Umargaon and Cochin at a cost of Rs 2.5 crore. From 6 April 2003, the 1857 Kranti shifted to the Sunday prime time (at 2130 instead of 1100 hours) on DD National to boost the viewership.

References 

Indian period television series
DD National original programming
Indian historical television series
2002 Indian television series debuts
Television shows set in the British Raj
Television series set in the 1850s
Television series set in the 19th century
Indian independence movement fiction
Mughal Empire in fiction
Works about the Indian Rebellion of 1857